Experiment Perilous is a 1944 melodrama set at the turn of the 20th century. The film is based on a 1943 novel of the same name by Margaret Carpenter, and directed by Jacques Tourneur. Albert S. D'Agostino, Jack Okey, Darrell Silvera, and Claude E. Carpenter were nominated for an Academy Award for Best Art Direction-Interior Decoration, Black-and-White. Hedy Lamarr's singing voice was dubbed by Paula Raymond.

Plot
The story takes place in 1903. During a train trip, psychiatrist Dr. Huntington Bailey (George Brent) meets a friendly older lady (Olive Blakeney), when she turns to him for reassurance during a torrential downpour. She tells him that she is going to visit her brother Nick and his lovely young wife Allida, both of whom she effectively raised. Once in New York, Bailey hears that his train companion suddenly died while visiting her brother for tea. Shortly afterwards, he meets the strange couple and becomes suspicious of Nick's treatment of his wife. Nick (Paul Lukas) keeps Allida (Hedy Lamarr), whom he is trying to pass off as crazy, a virtual prisoner in their  town house (a New York brownstone in the film), cutting off all contact with the outside world. The kindly Bailey takes it upon himself to attempt to free his new love, Allida, from the control of the insanely jealous Nick.

A frenzied gun battle and fist fight in their home, featuring the destruction of several large aquariums, replete with shattered glass, gushing water and floundering fish, may be the most memorable (and most often imitated) scene in the film. The house burns to the ground because of Nick's actions (killing him), but Allida, her son, and Hunt end up living happily in the country.

Cast

Production notes
The production dates for the film were July 12 through early October 1944.

According to pre-production news items in The Hollywood Reporter, this film originally was to be produced by David Hempstead and star Cary Grant. After Hempstead terminated his contract with RKO, Grant dropped out of the project, and Robert Fellows was assigned to produce it. Gregory Peck then was slated to star in the male lead, but a prior commitment to David O. Selznick productions forced him to withdraw.

To create the snow storm sequence, the studio used 100 tons of ice and six wind machines.

Radio adaptations
Experiment Perilous was presented on Screen Guild Players on October 12, 1946. Brent reprised his screen role, and Joan Bennett and Adolphe Menjou co-starred. George Brent reprised his role in a Lux Radio Theatre broadcast on September 10, 1945, co-starring Virginia Bruce.

Modern Culture
Released in the same year as the more famous Gaslight (1944), both films share the theme of a domineering husband manipulating his wife's reality through various forms of harassment, false flags and cruelty.  In both films the heroine is admonished by the husband for suffering delusions until she is rescued by a concerned suitor.  This form of psychological abuse eventually came to be known as Gaslighting, an homage to the latter mentioned film.

See also
 List of American films of 1944

References

External links

 
 
 
 
 

1944 films
1944 crime films
1944 mystery films
American mystery films
American black-and-white films
1940s English-language films
Film noir
Films based on American novels
Films set in 1903
Films directed by Jacques Tourneur
Films scored by Roy Webb
RKO Pictures films
1940s historical films
American historical films
Melodrama films
1940s American films
Historical mystery films